Stirling North is a town located  east of Port Augusta in the Australian state of South Australia. The now abandoned Marree railway line forms the official border line separating the two towns. Primarily, Stirling North is a satellite town to Port Augusta, in part because the Stirling North railway station was a rail junction at various times for four railway lines. Married railway employees from the station and Port Augusta were accommodated in about 100 houses near the station, and facilities such as a recreation hall were built by the Commonwealth Railways. A junction of the Augusta Highway and the Flinders Ranges Way also adjoins the town.

History
The locality that became Stirling North was originally known as Minchin Well – named after Henry Paul Minchin, the Sub-protector of Aborigines, who visited Aboriginal people at their camp next to a spring they had used for millennia and in 1854 organised a well to be dug. Later a stand pipe was constructed in the centre of the town to water stock and people. In 1859 Robert Barr Smith laid out a township there and named it "Stirling" after Edward Stirling, his business partner in Elder Smith & Co. Ltd, the firm that became the large agribusiness company, Elders Limited.

The town of Stirling North was surveyed in 1859 as "Stirling North" after Edward Stirling Snr, but was renamed 'Catninga' after a nearby creek. In 1916 however, this decision was overturned and the name was reverted to 'Stirling North'.

On 17 February 1994, suburban boundaries were assigned.

the Great Northern Railway eastwards, which finally ended at Alice Springs; a standard gauge line southwards to Port Pirie; a mainly coal-haulage line headed northwards to Leigh Creek Coalfield and Marree; and a  dual-gauge branch line to the Port Augusta power stationPort Augusta power station.

The town has existed mainly to service the railways, with Leigh Creek coal freighted down to Port Augusta for use in the power station. The historic Pichi Richi Railway runs through Stirling North, between Port Augusta and Quorn, one of the only tourist attractions within the town.

The town's historic Davenport Reservoir and Storage Tank is listed on the South Australian Heritage Register.

Facilities
Stirling North is not normally a tourist destination, but is commonly used as a service stop by travellers who do not want to travel the extra 8 km into Port Augusta. The town is situated at the base of the Southern Flinders Ranges, and is often used by people travelling north.

The town has a number of services including accommodation in the form of hotels, a public bar, a number of food shops, general store, fuel outlets, a post office and public telephones.

Only two sporting venues are present in the town, a tennis court, bike track, park (with toilets), public school which has a large oval and a golf course.

Notes

References

External links 
 Town information and Facilities
 Port Augusta City Council site

Towns in South Australia
Far North (South Australia)